Jiang Dingwen (December 30, 1895–2 January 1974), courtesy name Mingsan (銘三), was a KMT general from Zhuji, Zhejiang. He was a recipient of the China War Memorial Medal.

National Revolutionary Army generals from Zhejiang
1895 births
1974 deaths
Republic of China politicians from Zhejiang
Politicians from Shaoxing
Chinese police officers
Taiwanese people from Zhejiang
People of the Northern Expedition
People of the Central Plains War